Anagallis tenella, known in Britain as the bog pimpernel, is a low growing perennial plant found in a variety of damp habitats from calcareous dune slacks to boggy and peaty  heaths in Eurasia. In the United Kingdom it is mostly restricted to the western half of the country, although it was more common in the east before land drainage and intensification of farming in that area.

Traditionally included in the family Primulaceae, the genus Anagallis was considered to be better placed within the related family Myrsinaceae. In the APG III system, Primulaceae is expanded to include Myrsinacae, thus Anagallis is now in Primulaceae again.

In England this plant is a component of the Purple moor grass and rush pastures BAP habitat.

References

Sources
 
 

tenella
Flora of Europe
Taxa named by Carl Linnaeus